Ionel Budușan (born 24 October 1954) is a Romanian boxer. He competed in the men's welterweight event at the 1980 Summer Olympics.

References

External links
 

1954 births
Living people
Romanian male boxers
Olympic boxers of Romania
Boxers at the 1980 Summer Olympics
Place of birth missing (living people)
Welterweight boxers